Marius Fourie (born 15 October 1990 in Cape Town, South Africa) is a South African rugby union player who most recently played for . His regular position is hooker.

Career

Youth

Fourie played high school rugby for Hoërskool Outeniqua, where he played in excess of 60 matches.

Leopards / NWU Pukke

After finishing high school, Fourie enrolled at North-West University in Potchefstroom. He was the reserve hooker for the  side that played in the 2010 Under-21 Provincial Championship before being named in the ' senior squad for the 2011 Vodacom Cup competition.

In August 2011, Fourie made his debut in the 2011 Currie Cup Premier Division. He made a total of eight appearances in the Currie Cup Premier Division; however, with the Leopards just picking up one win all season to finish bottom of the competition and relegated to the First Division, this turned out to be his only appearances at this level.

In 2012, he started the season representing university side  in the 2012 Varsity Cup. He made seven appearances and scored one try as NWU reached the semi-final of the competition, where they lost to eventual winners . At the conclusion of NWU's involvement in that competition, Fourie reverted to the Leopards' senior side, making four appearances for them during the 2012 Vodacom Cup competition. He was one of their key players during their 2012 Currie Cup First Division campaign, making thirteen appearances.

Fourie made four appearances for the  during the 2013 Varsity Cup competition, this time narrowly missing out on a semi-final spot.

SWD Eagles

Griquas

He joined Kimberley-based side  for the 2016 season.

References

South African rugby union players
Living people
1990 births
Rugby union players from Cape Town
Rugby union hookers
Leopards (rugby union) players
SWD Eagles players